The Sterling Hall bombing occurred on the University of Wisconsin–Madison campus on August 24, 1970, and was committed by four men as an action against the university's research connections with the U.S. military during the Vietnam War. It resulted in the death of a university physics researcher and injuries to three others.

Overview

Sterling Hall is a centrally located building on the University of Wisconsin–Madison campus. The bomb, set off at 3:42 am on August 24, 1970, was intended to destroy the Army Mathematics Research Center (AMRC) housed on the 2nd, 3rd, and 4th floors of the building. It caused massive destruction to other parts of the building and nearby buildings as well. It resulted in the death of the researcher Robert Fassnacht, injured three others and caused significant destruction to the physics department and its equipment. Neither Fassnacht nor the physics department itself was involved with or employed by the Army Mathematics Research Center.

The bombers used a Ford Econoline van stolen from a University of Wisconsin professor of Computer Sciences. Pieces of the van were found on top of an eight-story building three blocks away and 26 nearby buildings were damaged; however, the targeted AMRC was scarcely damaged. Total damage to University of Wisconsin–Madison property was over $2.1 million ($ in ) as a result of the bombing.

Army Mathematics Research Center

During the Vietnam War, the 2nd, 3rd and 4th floors of the southern (east-west) wing of Sterling Hall housed the Army Mathematics Research Center (AMRC). This was an Army-funded think tank, directed by J. Barkley Rosser, Sr.

The staff at the center, at the time of the bombing, consisted of about 45 mathematicians, about 30 of them full-time. Rosser was well known for his research in pure mathematics, logic (Rosser's trick, the Kleene–Rosser paradox, and the Church-Rosser theorem)  and in number theory (Rosser sieve). Rosser had been the head of the U.S. ballistics program during World War II and also had contributed to research on several missiles used by the U.S. military.

The money to build a home for AMRC came from the Wisconsin Alumni Research Foundation (WARF) in 1955. Their money built a 6-floor addition to Sterling Hall. In the contract to work at the facility, it was required that mathematicians spend at least half their time on U.S. Army research.

Rosser publicly minimized any military role of the center and implied that AMRC pursued mathematics, including both pure and applied mathematics. The University of Wisconsin student newspaper, The Daily Cardinal, obtained and published quarterly reports that AMRC submitted to the Army. The Cardinal published a series of investigative articles making a convincing case that AMRC was pursuing research that was directly pursuant to specific U.S. Department of Defense requests, and relevant to counterinsurgency operations in Vietnam. AMRC became a magnet for demonstrations, in which protesters chanted "U.S. out of Vietnam! Smash Army Math!"

The Army Mathematics Research Center was phased out by the Department of Defense at the end of the 1970 fiscal year.

The bombers

The bombers were Karleton "Karl" Armstrong, Dwight Armstrong, David Fine, and Leo Burt. They called themselves the "New Year's Gang", a name which was derived from an exploit on New Year's Eve 1969. In that earlier attack, Dwight and Karl, with Karl's girlfriend, Lynn Schultz (who drove the getaway car), stole a small plane from Morey Field in Middleton. Dwight and Karl dropped homemade explosives on the Badger Army Ammunition Plant, but the explosives failed to detonate. They successfully landed the plane at another airport and escaped.

Before the Sterling Hall bombing, Karl had committed several other acts with anti-war motivations, including setting fire to a ROTC installation at the University of Wisconsin Armory and Gymnasium (the Red Gym) and one meant for the state Selective Service headquarters which instead held the University of Wisconsin Primate Research Center. Karl also attempted to plant explosives at a Prairie du Sac electrical substation that supplied power to the ammunition plant, but was frightened off by the night watchman.

Karleton “Blackman" Armstrong
Karl was oldest of the bombers, and had been admitted into the University of Wisconsin–Madison in 1964. He was changed by the Vietnam War and quit school a year later. He took on odd jobs for the next few years, and was re-accepted into the university in the fall of 1967. He was witness to violence between police and protesters on October 18, 1967, when the Dow Chemical Company arranged for job interviews with students on campus and many students protested and blocked potential interviewers from the building where the interviews were being held.

After the bombing, he went into hiding until he was caught on February 16, 1972, in Toronto. He was sentenced to 23 years in prison, but served only seven years. After his release, Armstrong returned to Madison, where he operated a juice cart called Loose Juice on the library mall. In the early 2000s, he also owned a deli called Radical Rye on State Street near the UW–Madison campus until it was displaced by the development of the Overture Center.

Dwight Armstrong
The younger brother of Karl, Dwight was 19 at the time of the bombing. After the bombing, he lived in a commune in Toronto, where he used the name "Virgo".  After a few months, he left the commune, went to Vancouver and then re-appeared in San Francisco, where he connected with the Symbionese Liberation Army (SLA), which was holding Patty Hearst at the time. It is believed he was not active in the SLA. He returned to Toronto and was arrested there on April 10, 1977. He pleaded guilty to the bombing, was sentenced to seven years in prison, and served three years before being released.

In 1987, he was arrested and then later convicted and sentenced to ten years in prison for conspiring to distribute amphetamines in Indiana. After being released from prison, he returned to Madison and worked for Union Cab until January 2001 when he purchased the Radical Rye Deli with his brother Karl.

Dwight Armstrong died from lung cancer on June 20, 2010, at age 58.

David Fine

David Fine came to Madison as a freshman in 1969 at the age of 17. He wrote for the campus newspaper The Daily Cardinal, and associated with the other writers, including Leo Burt. He met Karl Armstrong for the first time in the summer of 1970.

Being 18 years old at the time of the bombing, he was the youngest of the four bombers. He was captured in San Rafael, California, on January 7, 1976. He was sentenced to seven years in federal prison for his part in the bombing, and he served three years.

In 1987, after passing the Oregon bar exam, Fine was denied admission to the bar on the grounds that he "had failed to show good moral character". Fine appealed the decision to the Supreme Court of Oregon which upheld the decision.

Leo Burt
Leo Burt was 22 years old, and worked for the campus newspaper, The Daily Cardinal, with David Fine.  Burt came to Wisconsin following his interest in rowing, and he joined the crew team. He introduced Fine and Karl Armstrong to each other in July 1970.

After the bombing, Burt fled to Canada with Fine, and as of May 2020, still has not been seen. In 2010, there had been new leads on his possible whereabouts, which came up inconclusive.

Victims

Robert Fassnacht was a 33-year-old postdoctoral researcher at the University of Wisconsin–Madison. On the night and early morning of August 23/24, 1970, he had gone to the lab to finish up work before leaving on a family vacation. He was involved in research in the field of superconductivity. At the time of the explosion, Fassnacht was in his lab located in the basement level of Sterling Hall. He was monitoring an experiment when the explosion occurred. Rescuers found him face down in about a foot of water. He was survived by his wife, Stephanie, and their three children, a three-year-old son, Christopher, and twin one-year-old daughters, Heidi and Karin.

Injured in the bombing were Paul Quin, David Schuster, and Norbert Sutler.  Schuster, a South African graduate student, who became deaf in one ear and with only partial hearing in the other ear, was the most seriously injured of the three, suffering a broken shoulder, fractured ribs and a broken eardrum; he was buried in the rubble for three hours before being rescued by firefighters.  Quin, a postdoctoral physics researcher, and Sutler, a university security officer, suffered cuts from shattered glass and bruises. Quin, who became a physics professor at U. W. Madison, always refused to discuss the bombing in public.

See also
 Lists of protests against the Vietnam War#1970
 List of homicides in Wisconsin
 The War at Home (1979 film)
 Running on Empty (1988 film)

References

Further reading

External links

 
 
 
 
 

School bombings in the United States
1970 murders in the United States
Opposition to United States involvement in the Vietnam War
Riots and civil disorder in Wisconsin
University of Wisconsin–Madison
Murder in Wisconsin
Car and truck bombings in the United States
1970 in Wisconsin
School killings in the United States
Attacks on universities and colleges in the United States
August 1970 events in the United States
Terrorist incidents in the United States in 1970
History of Madison, Wisconsin